Pringle-Morse Consolidated Independent School District is a public school district based in the community of Morse, Texas (USA).

Besides Morse, the only other sizeable community in the district is Pringle.

Pringle-Morse Consolidated ISD covers southwestern Hansford County, northern Hutchinson County, and a small portion of southeastern Sherman County. It has one campus that serves students in grades pre-kindergarten through eight.

In 2009, the school district was rated "recognized" by the Texas Education Agency.

References

External links

Pringle-Morse Consolidated ISD

School districts in Hansford County, Texas
School districts in Hutchinson County, Texas
School districts in Sherman County, Texas